Sue Lewis Robinson (born 1952) is a former United States District Judge who was part of the United States District Court for the District of Delaware.

Education and career
Born Sue Lewis in Mount Carmel, Illinois, Robinson received a Bachelor of Arts degree from the University of Delaware in 1974 and a Juris Doctor from the University of Pennsylvania Law School in 1978. She was in private practice in Wilmington, Delaware from 1978 to 1983. She was an Assistant United States Attorney of the District of Delaware from 1983 to 1988.

Federal judicial service

Robinson was a United States magistrate judge of the District of Delaware from 1988 to 1991. On October 1, 1991, Robinson was nominated by President George H. W. Bush to a seat on the United States District Court for the District of Delaware vacated by Judge Jane Richards Roth. Robinson was confirmed by the United States Senate on November 15, 1991, and received her commission on November 18, 1991. She served as Chief Judge from 2000 to 2007. She assumed senior status on February 3, 2017. She resigned from the federal bench on July 14, 2017.

Deshaun Watson arbitration

Robinson acted as an arbiter in the punishment of Deshaun Watson by the NFL. Robinson weighed evidence and evaluated the NFL's previous rulings on sexual assault cases and first-time offenders according to the NFL's own policy to decide on an appropriate suspension. Robinson concluded that the NFL proved its case that Watson leveraged his position as an NFL player to perform sexual acts without consent. Robinson handed down the minimum six-game suspension for Watson on August 1, 2022.
Two days later on August 3, the NFL filed an appeal of the suspension. The appeal was dismissed by the mutual consent of the parties following a settlement that increased the suspension to an eleven-game term.

References

Sources
FJC Bio

1952 births
Living people
Assistant United States Attorneys
Judges of the United States District Court for the District of Delaware
United States district court judges appointed by George H. W. Bush
20th-century American judges
United States magistrate judges
University of Pennsylvania Law School alumni
University of Delaware alumni
20th-century American women judges